GTM may refer to:
 Guatemala
 Generative topographic map
 Global Traffic Manager, a load balancing module for some F5 Networks appliances
 Global Server Load Balancing
 Golden Triangle Mall, a mall in Denton, Texas
 Google Tag Manager
 Go to market, a strategy to approach the market with a new product or service
 GoToMeeting, online meeting and desktop sharing software
 Graduate Texts in Mathematics, a series of mathematics textbooks published by Springer-Verlag
 Grammar translation method
 Greater Manchester, metropolitan county in England, Chapman code
 Greentech Media, a media and research company that covers the green technology market
 Greystone Technology M, a schema-less transactional database
 Groovin' the Moo, an annual music festival held at various regional centres across Australia during the middle of the year
 Gross Ton Mile, the product of total weight (including the weight of lading cars and locomotives) and the distance moved by a train or other vehicle
 Gross Trailer Mass, the portion of the mass of a fully laden trailer that is carried by the wheels
 GT-M, a Soviet tracked military vehicle
 GT-MU, a command and control variant
 GTM Cars
 GTM Supercar Factory Five Racing
 Large Millimeter Telescope (Spanish: Gran Telescopio Milimétrico), the world's largest millimetric telescope, located in Mexico
 Great Translation Movement, online anti-war movement